Gabrielė Navardauskienė (née Jankutė; born 18 December 1993) is a Lithuanian former track and road cyclist. She competed in the 500 m time trial event at the 2012 UCI Track Cycling World Championships, and finished second in the 2015 Lithuanian National Road Race Championships.

Personal life
In September 2017, she married fellow Lithuanian cyclist Ramūnas Navardauskas, and the couple have a son, born in 2020. Following her retirement from cycling, Navardauskienė became a police officer with the Lithuanian Police Force in Klaipėda.

References

External links
 
 

1993 births
Living people
Lithuanian track cyclists
Lithuanian female cyclists
Lithuanian police officers